Anderl is both a given name and a surname. 

Notable people with the given name include:
Anderl Heckmair (1906–2005), German mountain climber and guide
Anderl Molterer (born 1931), Austrian alpine skier

Notable people with the surname include:
Günter Anderl (1947–2015), Austrian figure skater